412 Food Rescue is a nonprofit organization based in Pittsburgh, Pennsylvania, US, dedicated to ending hunger by organizing volunteers to deliver surplus food to insecure communities instead of landfills. Since its creation in 2015, the organization has redistributed over three million pounds of food  through the use of its mobile application, Food Rescue Hero. They are currently rolling out the app nationwide.

Food Reuse Strategy 

412 Food Rescue is unique in that it relies primarily on the efforts of volunteers to transport and deliver the food immediately. Their food distribution  model pairs one of its 450 donor organizations, often grocery stores and restaurants with other nonprofit partners so that the food may taken to individuals with no access to them.

Volunteers are notified of the pick-ups and deliveries to be made by the use of their Food Rescue Hero application. As such, 412 Food Rescue does not maintain an inventory or store food in warehouses. It obtains fresh and healthy produce which is immediately delivered by a volunteer to the non-profit organization that then distributes it to the food insecure recipients.

History

Early Beginnings 
The organization was founded by Leah Lizarondo and Gisele Barreto Fetterman in March 2015. Lizarondo was inspired by the Free Store, a free clothing outlet in Braddock run by co-founder Fetterman. The Free store gathers surplus goods and distribute them for free to those in need.

At the time of founding, food insecurity affected 14.2% of Pittsburgh. However, around 31% of food produced went straight to landfills. The two focused their efforts in solving both those problems by developing a means to bring the food to those who need it. Initially, 412 Food Rescue used the social media platform Facebook to recruit volunteers to transport food between donors and recipients. The organization has grown and shifted from the social media platform to their own application.

Impact 
412 Food Rescue has virtually eliminated emergency referrals, bringing them down from 5–7 a month to 0 on official reports. The organization has a 98 to 99 percent success rate with food pickups and deliveries. The organization helped furloughed federal employees during the 2019 government shutdown by setting up food distribution centers.

Programs

412 Food Rescue App 
412 Food Rescue's reliance on the efforts of thousands of volunteers is made possible through an application launched by the organization in November 2016 called Food Rescue Hero, which is available in both the Google Play Store and the iTunes App Store. Over 7,000 people have downloaded and registered on the application.

A volunteer who is a registered user of the application will receive an alert whenever a prospective donor wishes to donate. Details including the food, the quantity and the distance is made available to volunteer, who provides his or her own vehicle to pick-up the food and deliver it to the non-profit organization that receives it. The application's algorithm matches the available food to the suitable recipient.

Hidden Harvest 
Hidden Harvest retrieves fresh fruit from unharvested trees, orchards and farms around the city.  A map is crowd-sourced highlighting places to collect blackberries, mulberries, etc. Most of these fruits are apples which are donated to partner organizations. A substantial portion of these fruits can no longer be consumed as food which led to an initiative with Wigle Whiskey where the foraged apples are instead turned into pommeau.

UglyCSA 
The UglyCSA program allowing consumers to purchase fresh produce that has fallen short of cosmetic standards.

Awards 
The organization and its founders have gained widespread recognition for their efforts. Leah Lizarondo, the organization's CEO and co-founder has taken home many accolades including: 2018 Pittsburgh Smart 50 honoree and Impact award, Smart Business' Person to Watch 2017, Jekko's Pittsburgh Personality You Should Know 2016, and Pittsburgh City Paper's Pittsburghers of the Year. 412 Food Rescue won second place and $110,000 at the 2017 UpPrize, a social-innovation challenge. It was also recognized in the Pittsburgh Technology Council's Top 50 tech innovators in the region.

References

External links

 

Food waste
Hunger relief organizations
Organizations based in Pittsburgh
Organizations established in 2015